The Navigation Structures at Frankfort Harbor are a collection of breakwaters, piers, and other structures in Lake Michigan located at the foot of Second Street in Frankfort, Michigan.  They were listed on the National Register of Historic Places in 1997.

History
In 1854, running from a violent storm, Buffalo captain George Tifft ran his schooner over a sandbar and into the protection of Lake Betsie.  After the storm, while digging back out, Tifft took the opportunity to explore the area and realized it was an ideal location for a harbor.  Soon after Tifft brought word of his discovery back home, a number of people began purchasing property around the lake.  In 1859, private interests constructed two short piers and dredged out a channel between them, connecting Betsie Lake to Lake Michigan.

The harbor quickly became a popular refuge, and in 1867, Congress directed the Army Corps of Engineers to begin improvements on the harbor.  A new channel was cut, and by 1873 two new wooden piers had been constructed and a beacon installed at the pierhead.  As the harbor became more utilized, the piers were extended in 1884 and again in 1896, and a new lighthouse (the Frankfort Light, also on the National Register of Historic Places) was installed on the north pier in 1912.

In 1928, construction began on a pair of concrete breakwaters at the harbor entrance.  Construction was complete by 1932.  With the earlier piers now rendered obsolete, plans were made to shorten them, and the 1912 lighthouse was removed from the north pier and relocated at the head of the north breakwater. In 1934 the remaining stub piers were capped with concrete.  Piecemeal repairs were done on sections of the piers in the 1950s and 60s.

Description

Two stub piers line the entrance to the harbor within the breakwaters.

The lakeward sections of the breakwaters are stone-filled concrete, with riprap piled against the outside. The shoreward sections are wood pilings filled with stone and capped with concrete.

The Frankfort North Breakwater Light is located on the head of the north breakwater.

References

Further reading

Transportation buildings and structures on the National Register of Historic Places in Michigan
Transport infrastructure completed in 1867
Buildings and structures in Benzie County, Michigan
Piers on the National Register of Historic Places
Water transportation in Michigan
National Register of Historic Places in Benzie County, Michigan